Romancing SaGa 3 is a 1995 role-playing video game developed and published by Square for the Super Famicom. The sixth entry in the SaGa series, it was also the last developed for the platform. Originally released on the Super Famicom system in Japan on November 11, 1995, the game was released on the Virtual Console in Japan for Wii on September 21, 2010 and Wii U on February 26, 2014.

A remaster for Android, iOS and PlayStation Vita was announced on March 28, 2017. On April 11, 2017, Akitoshi Kawazu tweeted that they would be working on an English version of the game after releasing it in Japan. The remaster of Romancing SaGa 3 was released worldwide on November 11, 2019 for Android, iOS, Microsoft Windows, Nintendo Switch, PlayStation 4, PlayStation Vita and Xbox One with the game available in English for the very first time.

Gameplay
When the game begins the player chooses from eight characters to be the lead; additional characters can be found and recruited to the player's party throughout the game. The gameplay is similar to other console RPGs of the era, but with several notable differences. For example, instead of 'level ups', character stats increase individually depending on their participation in a battle. Also, a character has a certain amount of 'LP', which decreases when the character's HP is reduced below zero or when they are hit while their HP remains at zero. If the LP of a character is zero, they are removed from the party, but they can be recruited again with the exception of the main character of the current game; if the main character reaches zero LP, it results in an automatic game over.

During battle, characters can learn ("spark") new techniques which often turn the battle in their favor; the same goes for gaining the ability to evade certain enemy attacks. There is also a Commander mode, which requires at least one character more than the lead character, with the lead character on the back lines and out of the battle. If players have less than a full party of six, they may use a smaller formations (i.e. using a four-person formation with a party of five so the main character can direct in Commander mode.) During Commander mode, techniques that involve multiple characters can be learned, depending on the formation.

When choosing to play as Mikhail, the player will start with a mini-war campaign, which continues as the game progresses. Some of these war campaigns must be won or the player loses the game. In these battles, the player controls a band of soldiers instead of individual characters. The player issues commands (forward, quick forward, rush, defend, retreat, morale up, etc.). The point of the battle is to advance to the other side of the map (the player starts on the right and must advance to the left).

Synopsis
In the game's backstory, an event called the Rise of Morastrum occurs once every three centuries; a solar eclipse occurs, with every newborn of that year except one destined to die; this survivor is called the Child of Destiny and receives great power. 600 years prior, the Child of Destiny became an evil ruler called the Archfiend, while 300 years prior the Child of Destiny was a good hero called the Matriarch who toppled the Archfiend. Prior to the game's opening, the Rise of Morastrum occurs again, and people begin seeking the Child of Destiny to discover their eventual fate. The eight main characters, all known to each other, set out on their own quests and end up involved in the hunt for the Child of Destiny. They are Julian Nohl, a reckless and just swordsman; the tomboyish Ellen Carson; the shy Sarah Carson; Thomas Bent, friend to Julian, Ellen and Sarah; Monika Ausbach, sister to the Marquis of Loanne; Monika's brother Mikhail Ausbach von Loanne; Katarina Lauran, Monika's attendant; and Khalid, a wandering mercenary. They all cross paths in the village of Sinon.

During their journey, the chosen protagonist learns that the Rise of Morastrum is tied to a realm called the Abyss and its ruling Four Sinistrals, which creates the heralding eclipse to manifest their power through the Child of Destiny. The Matriarch's birth and rise to heroism prompted the Sinistrals' fall, but with the latest Rise of Morastrum the Abyss Gates linking their realm to the world open again. It is also revealed that this time, two Children of Destiny have been born; Sarah and one referred to as the "Young Boy". The chosen protagonist and their party close the Abyss Gates and defeat the Sinistral clones sent through to wreak havoc in the world. Sarah tries to sacrifice herself to the Abyss to maintain peace until the next Rise of Morastrum, but the party and the Young Boy follow through a surviving Abyss Gate. In the Abyss, Sarah and the Young Boy combine their powers, awakening Oblivion, a being embodying the Abyss's power. Oblivion's death decimates reality, but the benevolence of Sarah and the Young Boy use Oblivion's energy to restore and remake the world, now free of the Rise of Morastrum.

Development
Early work on Romancing SaGa 3 began at series developer and publisher Square in December 1993 shortly after the release of Romancing SaGa 2, with full production beginning in the summer of 1994. The production was troublesome for series creator Akitoshi Kawazu. While he wanted to return to the narrative and gameplay style of the original Romancing SaGa, he was unsure how to do it while innovating on the design. An early suggestion was to make the game a direct sequel to Romancing SaGa, but Kawazu wanted it to be an entirely original work. With this game, Kawazu became "more proactive" in designing side quests that players could enjoy and get lost in. Kawazu gathered ideas from the development team, which led to the character-specific mechanics such as Mikhail's war campaign and Thomas's trading mini-game. They were originally grander than the final versions, with Kawazu intending players to clear the whole game using these character-specific mechanics. Ultimately the battle system was the strongest element out of the implemented mechanics, so it became the dominant gameplay feature. The game was produced by Michio Okamiya, who was chosen by Kawazu after previously working in the company's advertising division.

The scenario was designed to combine the freedom of choice of earlier titles with the overarching narrative, with all the protagonists being part of a shared world and crossing paths during the adventure. The original story began with the concept that humans worldwide have superstitions regarding eclipses, and built on that the premise that there is actually something to fear, and that eclipses meant death to many people, so if you survived you must somehow be special. When writing the story, Kawazu decided that the heroic Matriarch should be a woman as traditionally the demonic antagonists of games at the time were male. This naturally led into the plot twist of there being two Children of Destiny, one a man and one a woman. Kawazu did not communicate this clearly at the time, so when graphic designer Hiroshi Takai created the opening cinematic, he wrote the Matriarch as a male "Hero King". A feature he had to drop was the characters realistically changing clothes during their adventure, which would have been prohibitively complicated.

The characters were designed by returning artist Tomomi Kobayashi. She wanted to achieve a "classic [and] cool" look for her characters, aiming for an elegant style. One of the designs she remembered as a challenge were the non-human characters such as a lobster and a snowman. Speaking of the snowman specifically, Kawasu originally wanted a European stereotypical snowman, which she created after an early draft design based on the Michelin Man was rejected. Kobayashi's favorite characters to design were Leonid and Mikhail. and the style she went for was one of elegance, trying to achieve a "classic, cool" look for her characters.

Music 
Kenji Ito returned from previous games as both composer and arranger. Rather than approach the game with a specific theme in mind, Ito allowed his music to evolve; while the opening theme evoked dread, he also wanted the score to represent hope. As Kobayashi's art was complete by the time Ito began work, he used them as inspiration for each character's theme. His favourite piece from the score was the character Robin's theme, which was written to parody an unspecified anime opening theme.

Release
Romancing SaGa 3 was released on November 11, 1995. It was the last game in the SaGa series developed for the Super Famicom. Three guidebooks were published by NTT Publishing between December 1995 and March 1996. The Super Famicom version of Romancing SaGa 3 went unreleased outside Japan, due to a combination of its potentially off-putting complexity and the amount of text needing translation.

Remaster
Discussions of doing a remaster of the game began even before the remaster of Romancing SaGa 2 was discussed in 2016. They also discussed remastering the original SaGa game, but decided to work in ‘’Romancing Saga 3’’ because it was not available in all regions. There was also growing concern that game resources from the Super NES era of games would become unusable and degrade. The remaster in 2019 featured updated graphics, new storylines, a new dungeon called “Phantom Maze”, and a new game + mode. Gameplay has been altered in several ways, including multiple game save slots, and the ability to access New Game + even if you haven't yet finished the game. Players are also able to turn off the new features if they chose.

Reception

Hardcore Gaming 101 praised the original title for being able to recruit many unique characters, unlike previous SaGa games where the characters were more generic, and praised the soundtrack as “excellent”.

TouchArcade reviewed the worldwide re-release of the game, praising its character development system, though cautioning that the game has a high degree of difficulty. Hardcore Gamer described the games open world as being innovative in 1995, but without a clear sense of where to go or what to do on occasion leading to the aforementioned difficulty. Siliconera described the game as a classic “read the manual game”, even from the beginning players must make choices of weapons and characters without much context.

Nintendo World Report also cited the revamped graphics, comparing them to Final Fantasy VI, but noted that the game did require a lot of “grinding”. RPGamer noted that players can become so focused on side quests that they must actively steer their characters toward the end of the game. They also noted that the side quests are too brief and “underdeveloped”.

The Super Famicom original sold 1.3 million units in Japan by 2002, making it the second best-selling Romancing Saga title and at that time third best-selling entry in the SaGa franchise. The PC remake version was among the best-selling new releases of the month on Steam.

Notes

References

External links

Romancing SaGa 3 Shrine at RPGClassics

1995 video games
Android (operating system) games
iOS games
Japan-exclusive video games
Nintendo Switch games
PlayStation 4 games
PlayStation Vita games
Role-playing video games
SaGa
Super Nintendo Entertainment System games
Video games developed in Japan
Video games featuring female protagonists
Video games scored by Kenji Ito
Virtual Console games
Virtual Console games for Wii U
Windows games
Xbox One games